Mother Tongue Society is an Estonian organization that focuses on topics related to the Estonian language.

The organization was established on 23 March 1920 at Tartu University. Nowadays, the organization is located in Tallinn. The organization is an associated organization of Estonian Academy of Sciences.

Publications
 Akadeemilise Emakeele Seltsi aastaraamat, 1921–1926
 Eesti Keel, 1922–1940
 Emakeele Seltsi Aastaraamat, 1955–
 Kodumurre, 1960–2002
 Oma Keel, 2000–

Directors
Directors:
 Lauri Kettunen: 1920–1924
 Andrus Saareste: 1925–1933, 1935, 1936–1941
 Julius Mägiste: 1934, 1936
 Arnold Kask: 1944, 1968–1982
 Johannes Voldemar Veski: 1946–1968
 Huno Rätsep: 1982–1989
 Tiit-Rein Viitso: 1989, 1993–1997
 Eeva Ahven: 1989–1990
 Henn Saari: 1990–1992
 Jüri Viikberg: 1992–1993
 Mati Erelt: 1997–2006
 Helle Metslang: seit 2006

Further reading
 Mati Erelt: Emakeele selts 80, in: Keel ja Kirjandus 5/2000, pp. 313–316.
 Ülo Tedre: Emakeele selts Nõukogude aastail, in: Keel ja Kirjandus 8/2000, pp. 578–582.

References

External links
 

Estonian language
Organizations based in Tallinn
Organizations based in Estonia